Robert Byrd (1917–2010) was a United States Senator from West Virginia.

Robert Byrd may also refer to:
Robert Byrd (architect), American architect
Robert Byrd (artist) (born 1942), American author and illustrator
Robert K. Byrd (1823–1885), American soldier and politician
Robert L. Byrd, Delaware legislator and lobbyist
Robert Byrd, American professional boxing referee, see Floyd Mayweather Jr. vs. Conor McGregor
Bobby Byrd (1934–2007), American musician, songwriter and record producer (The Famous Flames)
Bobby Day (1930–1990), also known as Bobby Byrd, American musician and songwriter (The Hollywood Flames, Bob & Earl)

See also

Robert Bird (disambiguation)
Byrd (surname)